The South African Railways Class 24 2-8-4 of 1949 is a steam locomotive.

In 1949 and 1950, the South African Railways placed 100  branch line steam locomotives with a 2-8-4 Berkshire type wheel arrangement in service.

Manufacturer

By the late 1940s, the South African Railways (SAR) still had a comparatively large mileage of  track. In South West Africa, where most of the locomotive fleet consisted of Classes 6, 7, GC and GCA, there were still hundreds of miles of  track. Considering the increasing age of these locomotives, the options were either to relay these tracks with  rail or to obtain new light branch line locomotives suitable for use on the existing track.

The Class 24 2-8-4 Berkshire type branch line steam locomotive was designed by Dr. M.M. Loubser, Chief Mechanical Engineer (CME) of the SAR from 1939 to 1949. The locomotives were built by North British Locomotive Company (NBL) of Glasgow, who delivered 100 of them in 1949 and 1950, numbered in the range from 3601 to 3700. The cast engine main frames and the Buckeye bogies for the tenders were supplied by General Steel Castings of Eddystone, Pennsylvania.

One of these locomotives, no. 3675, was the 2,000th locomotive to be built by NBL for the SAR and, to commemorate this milestone, a ceremony was conducted in Cape Town to name the locomotive Bartholomew Diaz after the Portuguese navigator Bartolomeu Dias who discovered the Cape of Good Hope in May 1488 and named it the Cape of Storms (Cabo das Tormentas). The ceremony was attended by the South African Minister of Transport and heads of departments of the SAR, as well as by the chairman and managing director of NBL.

Characteristics
The Class 24 had a one-piece cast-steel main frame which was cast integrally with the cylinders, including the cylinder hind covers, smokebox support frame, stays and various brackets, all of which would normally be separate items riveted or bolted onto the frames. Advantages of this arrangement are reduced maintenance and less time spent in shops. It was the first South African steam locomotive to be built using this technique.

They were built with Watson Standard no. 1 boilers, while their double hopper type ashpans were specially designed to clear the four-wheeled trailing bogies. Their specially designed Type MY tenders were similar in appearance to the Type MX and the North American Vanderbilt type tenders, with cylindrical water tanks. The tenders rode on three-axle Buckeye bogies to reduce the axle load and, along with the Type MX, became commonly known as Torpedo tenders.

The piston valves were actuated by Walschaerts valve gear and the standard SAR type steam reversing gear was arranged on the right-hand side. The engine and tender were both equipped with vacuum brakes and the engine's two  diameter vacuum cylinders were arranged outside the engine's frame and under the running boards, one on either side. The valve gear, brake gear and coupled wheel hubs were soft grease lubricated, while the bronze axle boxes had hard grease lubrication. The leading and trailing bogies were fitted with roller bearing axle boxes while the tender's bogies used plain bearings.

Service
The Class 24 was built to replace the old Classes 6, 7 and 8 locomotives in branch line service on light rail. When they were introduced, an elaborate programme was drawn up to show on which systems and on what sections they were to be employed.
 The Cape Western System, on the Saldanha-Kalbaskraal, Porterville-Hermon and Prince Alfred Hamlet-Wolseley sections.
 The Cape Midland System, on the Knysna-George, Alexandra-Barkly Bridge, Kirkwood-Addo and Somerset East-Cookhouse sections.
 The Orange Free State System, on the Dover-Vredefort, Wolwehoek-Arlington-Marquard, Theunissen-Winburg, Westleigh-Orkney and Vierfontein-Bultfontein sections.
 The Eastern Transvaal System, on the Soekmekaar-Komatipoort, Barberton-Kaapmuiden, Middelburg-Stoffberg, Brits-Beestekraal and Zebediela-Naboomspruit sections.
 The South West Africa System, on the De Aar-Karasburg and Keetmanshoop-Windhoek sections.

Most of them went to the South West Africa System, where 55 of them would be in operation. From some time between 1955 and 1959, they were also employed on the Keetmanshoop-Walvisbaai section. They remained in that territory until 1961, when strengthening of the track and the complete dieselisation of the South West Africa System made them available to be employed elsewhere.

Other branch lines to be served by the Class 24 include Breyten to Lothair, Nylstroom to Vaalwater, Port Elizabeth to Alexandra and George to Knysna. As a relatively powerful locomotive, they were also useful as suburban locomotives, a role they served in on the Springs-Nigel commuter line until electrification. Some eventually also worked on the Selati line in the Transvaal Lowveld. Heavy overhauls were done at Bloemfontein. The only province where they were unknown was Natal.

The Calvinia and Sakrivier branches had been worked almost exclusively by Class 19C locomotives from about 1950, but from 1951 two Class 24s were also allocated to Beaufort West and sub-shedded at Hutchinson. After February 1963, this was reduced to one Class 24 locomotive until long after the branch was dieselised c. 1960, using Class  locomotives based at De Aar. For some six months in the latter half of 1969, the Calvinia and Sakrivier branches reverted to steam-only operation when there was a huge surge in ore traffic that required the drafting in of more Class  locomotives to the Port Elizabeth mainline. A pair of Class 24 locomotives temporarily worked those branches in 1969 and 1970 as relief engines during the diesel-electric locomotive shortage.

Preservation

The following is a list of 24 class that have survived into preservation. January 1, 2019

References

External links

2060
2060
2060
2-8-4 locomotives
1′D2′ h2 locomotives
NBL locomotives
Cape gauge railway locomotives
Railway locomotives introduced in 1949
1949 in South Africa